Whitemouth Bog Ecological Reserve is an ecological reserve located southwest of Whiteshell Provincial Park, Manitoba, Canada. It was established in 2009 under the Manitoba Ecological Reserves Act, and protects a tract of rich peatland bog in southeastern Manitoba.

The ecological reserve is buffered by another  of protected land designated as the Whitemouth Bog Wildlife Management Area.

See also
 List of ecological reserves in Manitoba
 List of protected areas of Manitoba

References

External links
 Whitemouth Bog Ecological Reserve, Backgrounder
 iNaturalist: Whitemouth Bog Ecological Reserve

Ecological reserves of Manitoba
Protected areas established in 2009
Eastman Region, Manitoba
Nature reserves in Manitoba
Protected areas of Manitoba